E. A. Sims, Jr. (also called Ed,  and Zeke; November 4, 1937 – August 5, 2010) was a Canadian Football League tight end. He played for the Edmonton Eskimos, and the B.C. Lions. He was presented with a ring of honor for his achievements at New Mexico State University.

Early life
Sims was born in Abilene, Texas and was very active in sports in Junior High and High School.  He attended Cisco Junior College in Cisco, Texas where he played on their football team, The Wranglers.  He was made all star three years in a row and also received an outstanding player award. He later played football for the New Mexico State University Aggies in Las Cruces, New Mexico, where in December 1960 he helped defeat Utah State to  win the Sun Bowl. During his college career playing for the Aggies, he received another outstanding player award.

Professional career
In March 1961 Sims was selected by the Baltimore Colts during the 15th round of the NFL draft. In July 1961 he was traded to the Pittsburgh Steelers for a future draft choice. After sustaining a knee injury, Sims refused to report and in March 1962 he was signed by the Edmonton Eskimos, where he was to play for 7 seasons. In 1966 and in 1967 Sims was selected as a CFL All-Star. In 1968, Sims was cut from the Eskimos following the signing of Ed Marcontell, but was subsequently signed B.C Lions, where he played until 1970 when he retired from the league.

References

External links
Just Sports Stats

1937 births
2010 deaths
Sportspeople from Abilene, Texas
Players of American football from Texas
New Mexico State Aggies football players
American players of Canadian football
Canadian football defensive linemen
Edmonton Elks players
BC Lions players